Franco Atchou is a Togolese international football player.

Atchou played for the Togo under-20 side in the 2015 Orange African U-20 Cup of Nations in all 4 of their qualifying games against Morocco and Mali in 2014.

He played for Togo on 4 October 2016 in a friendly against Uganda. He had previously represented Togo in qualifying tournament for the 2016 African Nations Championship.

International career

International goals
Scores and results list Togo's goal tally first.

References 

1995 births
Living people
Togolese footballers
Togolese expatriate footballers
Dynamic Togolais players
Enyimba F.C. players
Fremad Amager players
Danish 1st Division players
Togo international footballers
Togo youth international footballers
2017 Africa Cup of Nations players
Association football midfielders
Expatriate men's footballers in Denmark
21st-century Togolese people